Aristide Coscia (March 15, 1918 – March 10, 1979) was an Italian professional football player and coach.

He played 14 seasons (370 games, 51 goals) in the Serie A for U.S. Alessandria Calcio 1912, A.S. Roma and U.C. Sampdoria. He is among the top 100 players with the most tabloid appearances in the Serie A.

Honours
 Serie A champion: 1941/42.

External links

1918 births
1979 deaths
Italian footballers
Serie A players
U.S. Alessandria Calcio 1912 players
A.S. Roma players
Inter Milan players
S.S.D. Varese Calcio players
Juventus F.C. players
U.C. Sampdoria players
Italian football managers
U.S. Alessandria Calcio 1912 managers
Association football midfielders